Prevoje pri Šentvidu ( or ) is a settlement northeast of Ljubljana on the road to Celje in Slovenia. It is in the Municipality of Lukovica in the eastern part of the Upper Carniola region.

Name
The name of the settlement was changed from Prevoje to Prevoje pri Šentvidu in 1953.

Notable people
Notable people that were born or lived in Prevoje pri Šentvidu include:
Jakob Zupan (1785–1852), linguist
Stanko Pelc (born 1957), geographer

References

External links

Prevoje pri Šentvidu on Geopedia

Populated places in the Municipality of Lukovica